Duck is a name applied to several bird species of the family Anatidae.

Duck, The Duck or ducks may also refer to:

Places
 Duck, North Carolina, United States, a small town
 Duck, West Virginia, United States, an unincorporated community
 Monte Creek, British Columbia, Canada, a rural locality originally named "Ducks"
 Duck Creek (disambiguation)
 Duck Island (disambiguation)
 Duck Lake (disambiguation)
 Duck River (disambiguation)

People
 Duck (nickname)
 Duck (surname)
 Duck, a pseudonym of Don Manley (born 1945), a British compiler of crosswords

Arts and entertainment

Fictional characters
 Duck (Alice's Adventures in Wonderland)
 Duck the Great Western Engine, a major character from the Railway Series and the children's television series Thomas & Friends
 Duck, in the anime Princess Tutu
 Duck, in the British horror web series Don't Hug Me I'm Scared
 Duck, a main character in the British television show Sarah & Duck
 Duck, in the animated television series WordWorld
 Wayne "Duck" Newton, in the podcast The Adventure Zone
 Duck Phillips, in the AMC television series Mad Men
 Ducks, a race of sentient creatures in the Glorantha setting for the fantasy role-playing games RuneQuest and Suikoden

Film and television
 Duck (film), a 2005 film by Nic Batterau
 Duck! The Carbine High Massacre, a 1999 film about a fictional school shooting
 Duck, a BBC Two television ident first aired in 1997 (see BBC Two '1991–2001' idents)
 "Duck! / Aren't You Chupacabra To See Me?", an episode of The Grim Adventures of Billy and Mandy
 "Ducks", an episode of the television series Teletubbies

Other media
 "The Duck" (song), a 1966 hit single by Jackie Lee
 Duck (video game), a 1987 puzzle platform game for NES
 Duck (album), a 2019 album by Kaiser Chiefs
 Ducks: Two Years in the Oil Sands, a 2022 graphic novel by Kate Beaton

Brands and enterprises
 Duck Brand, a duct tape brand now used on a variety of products
 Duck Donuts, a doughnut shop
 Duck Records, a record label
 Duck Studios, a production studio based in Los Angeles, California
 On2 Technologies, formerly The Duck Corporation, which designed video codec technology
 Toilet Duck, a brand of toilet cleaner, known simply as Duck in the British Isles

Sports and games
 Duck (bridge), a tactic in the card game of contract bridge
 Duck (cricket), a cricketing term denoting a batsman being dismissed with a score of zero
 Anaheim Ducks, a hockey team
 Beijing Ducks, a Chinese basketball team
 Lohja Ducks, a Finnish ice hockey team
 Long Island Ducks, a minor league baseball team
 Oregon Ducks, the sports teams of the University of Oregon

Transportation
 American Canyon Transit, also known as "The Duck"
 Citroën 2CV, a car model nicknamed "The Duck"
 Ducati, a motorcycle company, sometimes shortened to "Duc" or "Duck"
 , one of several vessels by that name
 DUKW, commonly pronounced "duck", an amphibious six-wheel drive vehicle used by the US military during World War II
 Goodyear Duck, a 1940s amphibian aircraft
 Grumman JF Duck, a 1930s biplane amphibious aircraft built for the US Navy
 Grumman J2F Duck, amphibious aircraft derived from the JF Duck

Other uses
 Duck, a lead weight used by draftsmen to hold splines in place
 Duck, a hypocorism or affectionate phrase, often used in parts of the Midlands and South Yorkshire in England, originally derived from the title Duke
 Duck, a very short cave sump
 Duck, in architecture, any building in the shape of something associated with it; named for the Big Duck
 Cotton duck, a fine strong cloth made from untwilled linen, later cotton
 Duck as food, the meat of the bird
 Duck Samford Stadium, a football stadium in Auburn, Alabama, nicknamed "The Duck"
 "Duck", the victim of Ducking (slang), a technique for manipulating prison staff
 Ducks (hiking) or cairn, a pile of three or more stones used to mark an off-trail hiking route

See also
 
 
 Ducking, an audio effect commonly used in radio and music
 Duck and cover
 Duckie (disambiguation)
 Ducky (disambiguation)